Copper Fox Distillery is a distillery that produces American whiskey in Sperryville, Virginia and Williamsburg, VA. The owner and operator of Copper Fox Distillery is Rick Wasmund.

History
Before starting Copper Fox, Wasmund apprenticed for six weeks at the Bowmore distillery on the Isle of Islay, learning the art of floor malting. Copper Fox was licensed to begin distilling by the Virginia ABC board in 2005 as a limited distiller (<5,000 gallons), and that year Copper Fox opened its first distillery in Sperryville, VA, in a converted apple packaging plant. Pursuing an additional location, Copper Fox purchased the historic Lord Paget Motor Inn in Williamsburg, VA, in 2015. They opened their second distillery location in July 2016, and both are operational today.

Process

Copper Fox uses barley bred specifically for the distillery and grown in Virginia, and Copper Fox is the only distiller in the United States to do 100% of its own malting. During the malt drying process, fruitwood (including applewood and cherrywood) smokes the grain, similar to peat smoke use in Scotch whiskies. All the wood used for the smoke comes from local orchards. In addition to malting for their own products, Copper Fox sells a portion of their malt to breweries, who use it to make beer.

Copper Fox whisky is distilled in a copper pot still and aged in used bourbon barrels (from another Virginia distillery, A. Smith Bowman, maker of Virginia Gentleman bourbon). Copper Fox utilizes 'chipping' in the aging of their whisky, adding a sachet of small chunks or 'chips' of charred wood to the aging barrel. Using this accelerated technique, Copper Fox whiskies are aged at a minimum of twelve months, compared to the 3 year minimum for Scotch Whisky. In addition to single malt whiskies, Copper Fox produces whiskies made from rye, clear spirits, and a botanical gin. They also plan on releasing a bourbon in the future. All bottles of alcohol produced at Copper Fox are filled and labelled by hand.

In 2018 Copper Fox launched new packaging. 

The new packaging and label design better organize the current product portfolio, better communicates the rich brand story at the shelf, and provides a cohesive and recognizable design that helps support our distributor partners and helps consumers shop across products and tiers. 

Across the complete portfolio, the front label shape is consistent and each whiskey category has its own unique color in the descriptor section of the face label. The Copper Fox brandmark on the front label has been enlarged and highlighted with copper and silver foil embossing accents which adds to the upscale feel and provides easier brand name recognition on the back bar and retail shelf.  Front labels describe our process in detail, back labels tell our story and the closures have been upgraded to a wood bar top to represent our connection to “the wood”. The necker label sayings and batch designations are a way for us to continue to have fun and be creative. Awards, tasting notes and cocktail recipes for each whisky will eventually be provided on hanging neck tags. 

Current fans familiar with Copper Fox will no longer see “Wasmund’s” on the labels. Although the label has changed, the “original” spirits are the same. According to founder Rick Wasmund, “in a way, it is somewhat bittersweet, but it’s not about me. The consolidation of our products under the Copper Fox brand reflects our mission and strong commitment and plans for continued growth”

Products
 Copper Fox Original Single Malt Whisky
 Copper Fox Original Rye Whisky
 Copper Fox Peachwood Single Malt Whisky
 Copper Fox SASSY Rye Whisky
 Copper Fox :Dawson's Reserve" Bourbon
 Copper Fox Chestnut American Whisky
 Copper Vir Gin
 Copper Fox Port Style Barrel Aged Single Malt 
 Copper Fox Port Style Barrel Aged Rye Whisky
 Copper Fox Apple Brandy Barrel Aged Single Malt
 Copper Fox Apple Brandy Barrel Aged Rye
 Copper Fox Cognac Barrel Aged Rye
 Copper Fox Single Malt Spirit
 Copper Fox Rye Spirit
 Copper Fox Bourbon Mash Spirit
 Copper Fox Barrel Kits for aging spirits
 Belle Grove 1797 Whiskey

Awards
 Wasmund's Single Malt Whisky
 92 points (Exceptional), Beverage Testing Institute 
 Gold Medal, International Review of Spirits, Beverage Testing Institute
 Best in Class (Class: Malt Whiskey - Un-aged), American Distilling Institute 2011 Judging 
 Copper Fox Rye
 94 points (Exceptional), Beverage Testing Institute 
 Gold Medal, International Review of Spirits, Beverage Testing Institute
 Bronze (Class: Rye - Un-aged), American Distilling Institute 2011 Judging

References

Official Copper Fox Distillery Website

Companies based in Virginia
Whiskies of the United States
Rye whiskey
Food and drink companies established in 2000
Distilleries in Virginia
American companies established in 2000
2000 establishments in Virginia
Williamsburg, Virginia
Rappahannock County, Virginia